The 2010 Coppa Italia Final was the final match of the 2009–10 Coppa Italia, the 63rd season of the top cup competition in Italian football. The match was played at the Stadio Olimpico in Rome on 5 May 2010 between Internazionale and Roma and was a repeat of the 2008 Coppa Italia Final. The match was won by Internazionale, who claimed their sixth Coppa Italia title with a lone Diego Milito goal giving them a 1–0 win. It was the first time Inter won the trophy since the abolition of the two-legged final.

Previous finals
This is the fifth final between these two clubs, the four previous matches dating back to the last five years and being consecutive between 2005–2008. This incredible list of repeated finals is increasing disputes around the actual competition formula, which gives an excessive advantage to the clubs participating in the European cups, who enter the cup in the round of 16 and play single matches at home.

Road to the final

Match

Details

References

2010
Coppa Italia Final
Coppa Italia Final 2010
Coppa Italia Final 2010